Caleb Miller (born September 3, 1980) is a former American football linebacker. He was originally drafted by the Cincinnati Bengals in the third round of the 2004 NFL Draft. He played college football at Arkansas.

Early years
Miller was a three-year starter for the Razorbacks at outside linebacker, after an all-state senior year at Sulphur Springs, Texas.

College career
Miller was the Defensive MVP of the 2003 Independence Bowl after registering 16 tackles in the game. Arkansas Razorbacks finished the year at 9-4, and Miller was a 2nd team Southeastern Conference selection.

References

1980 births
Living people
American football middle linebackers
American football outside linebackers
Arkansas Razorbacks football players
Cincinnati Bengals players